Jätkäsaari is a peninsula and a quarter in Helsinki, the capital city of Finland. It is part to the Kampinmalmi district and Länsisatama neighbourhood. It was the location of the main container harbour in Helsinki until late 2008, when the harbour moved to the new facilities in Vuosaari. The terminal for passenger ferries to Tallinn, Estonia, remains in Länsisatama (literally West Harbour in Finnish).

What is now known as Jätkäsaari (literally Docker Island in Finnish), was originally a group of four islands: Jätkäsaari (Busholm), Hietasaari (Sandholm), Saukko (Uttern) and tiny Saukonkari. The sea between the islands and the continent was filled, creating a peninsula to house harbour facilities. The area became an island once more with the construction of the Ruoholahti Canal. With most of the harbour operations having moved to the new Vuosaari Harbour, the construction of a new mixed-use city district began in late 2009, after a clean-up of contaminated soil was completed.

The new Jätkäsaari area is planned as an urban, densely built city district, built around the shoreline and an S-shaped park in the middle. The apartment blocks will be closed to protect the inner courtyards from wind. The planners envisage the completed area of having 17,000 residents as well as 6,000 jobs. The area will have several schools, kindergartens, sports facilities and public services. The public transport in Jätkäsaari will be handled primarily by extensions of the Helsinki tram network. The waste collection and sorting is planned to operate by automated vacuum collection.

History

Etymology 
The name of the area has appeared in old documents as Busholmen (1696), Busholm (1750) and Buus Holmen (1777).

The Finnish name of Jätkäsaari has been translated from Swedish. At the time, it was thought that the word bus in the Swedish name meant a dock worker (hamnbuse). Later it has been connected to the ancient Swedish word buza meaning a merchant ship. The latter meaning has also been connected with the island of Hästö-Busö in Ekenäs. There are also other suggestions: in local Swedish dialects bus means a bogeyman. Jätkäsaari was marked as "Mörkösaari" ("Bogeyman island") in some maps in 1912. Other explanations have sought the etymology from the words buts (hill) or bu/bo (cattle). It is however most likely that the word bus refers to some old harbour place. The Finnish name of the island was confirmed as Busholma in 1909 and then as Jätkäsaari in 1928.

Inhabitation 

The history of inhabitation on the island starts from the late 19th century. In 1865 there were only about twenty permanent inhabitants in Jätkäsaari in their little cabins. The permanent inhabitants of Jätkäsaari were professional fishermen, and it also served as an area of vacation villas for the gentry and as a recreational area for citizens of Helsinki. In summer it was a place for swimming and in winter a place for down-hill skiing.

As a cargo harbour 

The West Harbour was decided to be built in Jätkäsaari in 1911, but still in 1916 the city built a swimming pool on the island, which had to be dismantled already after three years. The construction of the harbour started in 1913, and the island was connected to the mainland by a wide bridge with railway tracks running in the middle. The new branch of the Helsinki harbour rail running from the Helsinki Central Station to Katajanokka, branching off to Jätkäsaari, was built in 1916. A long pier was built in the harbour. The neighbouring islands of Hietasaari and Saukko were merged to the Jätkäsaari harbour area by leveling them and filling the sea in between them with reclaimed land. The name Jätkäsaari for the new continuous area was established in 1928.

In terms of traffic, the harbour was the largest in Helsinki since the 1960s, and its expansion continued in the 1970s. The area was still being expanded with reclaimed land, and when a part of the bay to the north of Jätkäsaari was filled in, Jätkäsaari changed from an island to a large peninsula. During the next decades, the traffic in the West Harbour grew to the full extent of its capacity. Train and truck traffic to and from the harbour started to become overwhelming in terms of the traffic connections in the city centre. The nearly century-old harbour finally moved to the Vuosaari Harbour with a larger capacity in November 2008, and only passenger traffic to Estonia (mostly to Tallinn) remained at the Länsiterminaali terminal. Construction of a new residential area started in the place of the previous huge container harbour. The last of the railway tracks were dismantled in spring 2009.

Jätkäsaari into a residential area 

The entire Jätkäsaari area has an area of over 100 hectares. The part of the island north of Laivapojankuja was converted into a residential area already in the 1990s as part of the construction project of Ruoholahti, and at the same time the Ruoholahti canal was dug, making the area into an island once again. The most part of Jätkäsaari still remained in use for the harbour.

When the cargo ship harbour had moved to Vuosaari in November 2008, Jätkäsaari started to be rebuilt into a new district with 18 thousand inhabitants and 6 thousand jobs as part of the Länsisatama construction project in 2010. The first houses were constructed once the soil had been cleaned and streets had been built. The automated vacuum collection system Rööri was also built in the area in early 2014.

The old Huutokonttori building, originally built as an employment office for sailors, has been converted into a fire station and also serves as the Jätkäsaari information centre and library. The flagship store of the Verkkokauppa.com chain and the Finland head office of Tallink Silja are also located next to the West Harbour. The 16-floor Clarion Hotel Helsinki was opened in October 2016.

Construction of the area will continue to the end of the 2020s. There are plans to build about 300 new apartments, a swimming pool and exercise spaces in the old Bunkkeri building originally built as a warehouse for the cargo ship harbour. In 2019 there were plans to build a new parking garage, a new sports centre and a 24-floor Royal Center hotel in Jätkäsaari, construction of which started in early 2020. The Swedish-speaking city block Kvarteret Victoria was also built in the area.

A layer of sediment about half a metre thick was found at the bottom of the sea in front of Jätkäsaari, containing large concentrations of tributyltin, hazardous to the marine life.

As a concert stage 
The pop singer-songwriter Madonna performed on an open field in Jätkäsaari on 6 August 2009 as part of her Sticky & Sweet Tour. 85 thousand tickets to the concert were sold, making it the largest for-pay concert ever held in the Nordic countries. The surrounding air and maritime space were closed as a safety precaution during the evening and the night.

Transport

Public transport 
By design, Jätkäsaari has 3 operating tram lines (trams 7, 8, 9) but no bus lines. The large number of arriving and departing ship passengers at the passenger harbour means that occasionally trams are fully packed. However, a metro stop and several bus lines can be found in neighbouring Ruoholahti district which is less than a 15-minute walk from the harbour.

The tram line 8 originally had its terminus in Salmisaari but it was expanded via the Crusell Bridge to Saukonpaasi in Jätkäsaari in early 2012 and the tram line 9 from the city centre was expanded to the Länsiterminaali ferry terminal in August 2012. After the tram tracks on Välimerenkatu were completed in August 2017 the terminus of tram line 9 moved to Saukonpaasi, but after the new Atlantinsilta bridge was completed in May 2021 the tram line was extended via Atlantinkatu to the Länsiterminaali ferry terminal.

There is a taxi station at the ferry terminal. Taxis from the Ruoholahti metro station and the Seaside hotel also come to the area.

Tunnel project 
In February 2021 the Helsinki City Council approved the construction of a harbour tunnel from Jätkäsaari to the Länsiväylä highway. The projected cost of the tunnel is 180 million euro.

Post office and post codes 
There is a post office open 24/7 in Jätkäsaari in the premises of the Verkkokauppa.com store. It serves the post code areas of 00180 and 00220 Helsinki. The street Välimerenkatu acts as a divisor between them, so that the odd numbers on its northwestern side have the post code 00180 and the even numbers on its southeastern side have the post code 00220.

Gallery

See also 
 Subdivisions of Helsinki
 Crusell Bridge

References

Neighbourhoods of Helsinki
Islands of Helsinki